Jan-e Oshagh ) is an Iranian traditional music album with the voice of Mohammad Reza Shajarian and the collaboration of Parviz Meshkatian, Dariush Pirniakan, Javad Maroufi and Mohammad Reza Darvishi, which was performed in 1985 and released in 1995. The songs of this music collection have been selected from Hafez's lyric poems and Babataher couplets.

The album has 10 tracks, three of which are non-verbal, and the lyrics of the rest are by Hafez and Babataher. This album has been performed in Avaz-e Dashti and Bayat-e Esfahan and has been released by Del Avaz Company. Shajarian's two children, Homayoun Shajarian and Mojgan Shajarian, have collaborated with their father in mastering and graphic designing the album.

Reza Darvishi has been in charge of arranging the pieces in this work.

Personnel
 Composer: Parviz Meshkatian
 Musicians: Parviz Meshkatian, Mohammad Reza Darvishi and Javad Maroufi
 Music arranger: Mohammad Reza Darvishi
 Songwriters: Hafez Shirazi and Babataher
 Singer: Mohammad Reza Shajarian

Track listing

References

External links
Official website

Mohammad-Reza Shajarian albums
1985 albums
1980s classical albums